Mitinti  (Philistine: 𐤌𐤕𐤕 *Mītīt or *Matīt; Akkadian:   and  ) was the name of several Philistine kings in the 8th and 7th century BC:

 Mitinti I, king of Ashkelon and contemporary of Rezin of Aram-Damascus, Ahaz of Judah, Qaus-malaka of Edom, and Shanip of Ammon. The annals of Tiglath-Pileser III record that he was amongst the kings who rebelled against Neo-Assyrian suzerainty over the Levant, and that following the defeat of Rezin and the conquest of Aram-Damascus, the throne of Ashkelon was usurped by a man named Rukibtu.
 Mitinti II, another king of Ashkelon, son of Sidqa, who apparently succeeded Rukibtu. He ruled Ashkelon during the reign of Ashurbanipal. A seal belonging to his servant, ‘Abd’eli’ab, was recovered in Ireland in the 19th century and is now housed in the British Museum. How Mitinti II came to rule Ashkelon is somewhat unclear – the annals of Sennacherib state that he had deposed Sidqa as king of Ashkelon and replaced him with Rukibtu's son Šarru-lu-dari after Sidqa instigated a failed revolt against Assyria, however, Šarru-lu-dari was apparently relegated to the governor of Pelusium during the reign of Esarhaddon - how Sidqa's son was then able to claim the throne is unexplained.
 Mitinti, king of Ashdod. He ruled during the reign of Sennacherib. His rule was apparently contemporaneous with that of Sidqa, as Sennacherib's annals report that he was among a retinue of kings that brought him an exuberant payment of tribute before Sidqa's rebellion.

References

Philistine kings
Philistines
7th-century BC rulers
8th-century BC rulers
Ashkelon
Ashdod